The Key is a 1971 Czechoslovak drama film directed by Vladimír Čech. It was entered into the 7th Moscow International Film Festival where it won a Silver Prize.

Cast
 František Vicena as Jan Zika
 Wilhelm Koch-Hooge as Friedrich
 Zdenek Kampf as Nergl
 Vlasta Vlasáková as Milada
 Eva Jirousková as Blazena Preislerová
 Oldřich Velen as Josef Preisler
 Jürgen Frohriep as Nemecký chirurg
 Miloslav Holub as Jankovský
 Alena Hessová as Ziková
 Josef Chvalina as Doktor

References

External links
 

1971 films
1971 drama films
1970s war drama films
1970s Czech-language films
Czech war drama films
Czech resistance to Nazi occupation in film
Czech World War II films
Czechoslovak World War II films
1970s Czech films